Vladimir Vasilyevich Maksimov was a stage and silent film actor in the Russian Empire and later the Soviet Union.

Filmography 
 The Decembrists as Emperor Alexander I (1927)
 Man Is Man's Enemy as Kraev (1923)
 Locksmith and Chancellor as Frank Frey (1923)
 Infinite Sorrow (1922)
 Be Silent, My Sorrow, Be Silent (short) as Volyntsev, an artist (1918)
 Zhenshchina, kotoraya izobrela lyubov (1918)
 Zhivoy trup (1918)
 U kamina as Peshcherskij (1917)
 Vor (1916)
 Peterburgskiye trushchobi (1915)
 Das Haus ohne Tür (1914)
 Anfisa (1912)
 Kashirskaya starina (1911)
 Oborona Sevastopolya (1911)
 V polnoch na kladbishche (short) (1910)

References

External links

See also 
Ossip Runitsch
Vitold Polonsky
Vera Kholodnaya

Male actors from the Russian Empire
Soviet male actors
Male actors from Moscow
1880 births
1937 deaths